Thaddeus Quentin Mumford Jr. (February 8, 1951 – September 6, 2018) was an American television producer and writer. He wrote and produced for a number of television series spanning different genres, including The Cosby Show, A Different World, M*A*S*H, Maude, Good Times, Home Improvement, Roots: The Next Generations, and Judging Amy, among other series.

Career
Often collaborating with fellow TV producer/director Dan Wilcox, Mumford wrote scripts and/or produced for a number of television series throughout his career varying different genres namely, M*A*S*H (all of those episodes he produced were co-produced with Wilcox), The Cosby Show, A Different World, Maude, NYPD Blue, Good Times, Home Improvement, the very short-lived but critically acclaimed, Emmy Award-winning animated/live action NBC-TV sitcom series The Duck Factory in 1984 (which starred a very young Jim Carrey), ALF, Roots: The Next Generations, Judging Amy, amongst other series.

In 1973, Mumford won a Primetime Emmy Award for his writing in The Electric Company. In 1978, a Sesame Street character was named after him (Dr. Thad of "Dr. Thad and the Medications", who sang "The Ten Commandments of Health"). Mumford also performed the voice for the character.

Mumford also gained some renown working as a batboy for the New York Yankees.

Death
Mumford died after a long illness on September 6, 2018, aged 67, at his father's home in Silver Spring, Maryland. His father, Thaddeus Mumford Sr., died of cancer a few weeks earlier on August 3, 2018.

References

External links

1951 births
2018 deaths
American television producers
American television writers
American male television writers
Emmy Award winners
Sesame Street Muppeteers
Screenwriters from Washington, D.C.